The 1981 Tour de Suisse was the 45th edition of the Tour de Suisse cycle race and was held from 10 June to 19 June 1981. The race started in Wohlen and finished in Zürich. The race was won by Beat Breu of the Cilo–Aufina team.

General classification

References

1981
Tour de Suisse
1981 Super Prestige Pernod